An air flow meter is a device that measures air flow, i.e. how much air is flowing through a tube.  It does not measure the volume of the air passing through the tube, it measures the mass of air flowing through the device per unit time.  Thus air flow meters are simply an application of mass flow meters for a special medium.  Typically, mass air flow measurements are expressed in the units of kilograms per second (kg/s).

In automobiles

In industrial environments
Air flow meters monitor air (compressed, forced, or ambient) in many manufacturing processes.
In many industries, preheated air (called "combustion air") is added to boiler fuel just before fuel ignition to ensure the proper ratio of fuel to air for an efficient flame. Pharmaceutical factories and coal pulverizers use forced air as a means to force particle movement or ensure a dry atmosphere. Air flow is also monitored in mining and nuclear environments to ensure the safety of people.

See also
 Anemometer
 List of sensors
 Mass flow sensor
 :Category:Engines
 :Category:Engine fuel system technology
 Thermal mass flow meter

References

External links

 Miata.net, Repair broken Air Flow Meter, by Zach Warner, 2 January, 2009
 Clarks garage, AFM shop manual, Air Flow Meter (AFM) Operation and Testing, 1998
 Auto shop 101, AFM sensor
 Spitzer, David W. (1990), Industrial Flow Measurement, 

Flow meters
Engine fuel system technology

ja:エアフロメーター